The Algerian consulate bombing in Marseille, France, happened on 14 December 1973, killing four people and injuring 23 others, many of them seriously. Except for one Armenian, all victims were Algerian.

The attack was orchestrated by the Charles Martel Group, a far-right organisation made up of former Organisation armée secrète (OAS) members. It was their first attack. The bombing culminated a year which saw a high number of racist violence incidents against Algerians in the country, particularly in Marseille, which was mainly ignited by the murder of a local bus driver by a deranged Algerian youngster on 25 August 1973.

On 28 January 2018, a memorial plaque was placed on the consulate's entrance.

See also
 List of right-wing terrorist attacks
1980 Turkish Consulate attack in Lyon

References

1973 in international relations
1973 murders in France
20th century in Marseille
20th-century mass murder in France
Consulate bombing in Marseille
Attacks on buildings and structures in Marseille
Attacks on diplomatic missions in France
December 1973 crimes
December 1973 events in Europe
Improvised explosive device bombings in 1973
Improvised explosive device bombings in France
Mass murder in 1973
Murder in Marseille
Building bombings in France
Right-wing terrorist incidents